The 1954 NFL Championship Game was the National Football League's 22nd annual championship game, held on December 26 at Cleveland Stadium in Cleveland, Ohio. Billed as the "1954 World Professional Football Championship Game," the turnover-plagued contest was won by the Cleveland Browns, who defeated the Detroit Lions 56–10.

Background

The Detroit Lions (9–2–1) of the Western Conference met the Cleveland Browns (9–3) of the Eastern Conference in the NFL title game for the third consecutive year. The  Lions won the previous two: 17–7 at Cleveland in 1952 and 17–16 at home in Briggs Stadium in 1953.  They were attempting to become the first team to win three consecutive league titles in the championship game era (since 1933). The Browns, who  entered the league only in 1950 with the demise of the All-America Football Conference, faced a particularly daunting task in taking on the Lions, having lost all eight of the franchise's previous matches against the Detroit club.

The Lions were led by quarterback Bobby Layne, running back Doak Walker, and head coach Buddy Parker. The Browns were led by head coach Paul Brown and quarterback Otto Graham. The Lions had won the regular season meeting 14–10 the week before on December 19, also at Cleveland, with a late touchdown.  The game had been postponed from early October, due to the World Series, and both teams had already clinched their berths in the title game. Detroit was a slight favorite (2½ to 3 points) to three-peat as champions.

The underdog Browns won the title at home in a rout, 56–10; placekicker Lou Groza made eight extra points, a new title game record, among many.

Starters

Cleveland Browns

 Pete Brewster, LE
 Lou Groza, LT
 Abe Gibron, LG
 Frank Gatski, C
 Chuck Noll, RG
 John Sandusky, RT
 Dante Lavelli, RE
 Otto Graham, QB
 Ray Renfro, LHB
 Billy Reynolds, RHB
 Maurice Bassett, FB

Detroit Lions

 Dorne Dibble, LE
 Lou Creekmur, LT
 Harley Sewell, LG
 Andy Miketa, C
 "Jungle Jim" Martin, RG
 Charles Ane, RT
 Earl "Jug" Girard, RE
 Bobby Layne, QB
 Doak Walker, LHB
 Lewis Carpenter, RHB
 Bill Bowman, FB

Note: Players often played both offense and defense in this period. Although free substitution existed from 1943, what are today considered defensive starters were categorized as "substitutes" in this era.

Game Summary
First quarter

On its first possession, Lions' fullback Bill Bowman ran for 50 yards but lost the ball to Cleveland on a fumble. The Lions regained possession at the Cleveland 35 when Joe Schmidt intercepted an Otto Graham pass. The Browns defense held and Detroit was forced to settle for a 36-yard field goal by Doak Walker.

Billy Reynolds returned the subsequent kickoff 46 yards, crossing midfield to the Lions' 41 yard line. Cleveland was forced to punt but a roughing penalty gave the Browns new life and Graham hit Ray Renfro with a 35-yard pass for a touchdown. Following the Lou Groza conversion, the score stood at Cleveland 7, Detroit 3.

On the next possession another Layne interception by defensive back Paul was run back 33 yards, setting up Cleveland in the red zone on the Detroit 8 yard line, with Graham hitting left end Darrell Brewster for the score. Following Groza's kick the score was Browns 14, Lions 3.

Second quarter

Detroit was again stopped on their next possession and its punt was taken by Cleveland's Billy Reynolds and returned 46 yards to the Detroit 10 yard line. Grinding the ball to the 1 yard line, Graham ran a quarterback sneak and hit paydirt. Following the Groza conversion the score stood at Browns 21, Lions 3.

Lion running back Lewis Carpenter tore up a 52-yard run in Detroit's next possession, setting up Detroit for its only touchdown of the day when fullback Bill Bowman scored from five yards out. Following the conversion by Lions kicker Doak Walker, it was Browns 21, Lions 10.

Cleveland was forced to punt, but on the next Detroit possession defensive lineman McCormack ripped the ball from Layne, with the Browns recovering on the Detroit 31. Four plays later Graham ran for another touchdown, reaching the end zone standing up. With the conversion the score was Browns 28, Lions 10, and the rout was on.

Yet another Bobby Layne pass was intercepted by Cleveland's Michaels, who was listed as a substitute fullback and was thus probably playing the modern equivalent of the safety position. With the ball on the Lions' 31, Otto Graham launched a pass to halfback Ray Renfro, who made a great catch at the five yard line and took the ball over the score. With Groza's conversion, the halftime score was Browns 35, Lions 10.

Third quarter

The Browns opened the second half with a six play drive, highlighted by a 43-yard strike from Otto Graham to Pete Brewster, who was stopped just short of the goal line. Graham scored his third touchdown of the day with a quarterback sneak, with Groza converting to make the score Browns 42, Lions 10.

Kenny Konz grabbed the first of his two interceptions, running the ball back to the Detroit 13. Two plays later substitute fullback Curly Morrison scored on a 12-yard run. Following the Groza extra point, the third quarter score stood at Browns 49, Lions 10.

Fourth quarter

Yet another pick by Konz set up the final touchdown of the day, when substitute halfback Chet Hanulak scored from the 10. With Groza's extra point, the final score was reached: Browns 56, Lions 10.

Line summary
Sunday, December 26, 1954
Kickoff: 2 p.m. EST

First quarter
DET – FG Walker, 36 yards, 3–0 DET
CLE – Renfro 35-yard pass from Graham (Groza kick), 7–3 CLE
CLE – Brewster 8-yard pass from Graham (Groza kick), 14–3 CLE
Second quarter
CLE – Graham 1-yard run (Groza kick), 21–3 CLE
DET – Bowman 5-yard run (Walker kick), 21–10 CLE
CLE – Graham 5-yard run (Groza kick), 28–10 CLE
CLE – Renfro 31-yard pass from Graham (Groza kick), 35–10 CLE
Third quarter
CLE – Graham 1-yard run (Groza kick), 42–10 CLE 
CLE – Morrison 12-yard run (Groza kick), 49–10 CLE
Fourth quarter
CLE – Hanulak 10-yard run (Groza kick), 56–10 CLE

Game statistics 

 Total yards: Cleveland 303; Detroit 331
 Passing: Cleveland: (9-12) 165 yards; Detroit (19-44) 195 yards
 Yards rushing: Cleveland 140; Detroit 136
 First downs: Cleveland 17; Detroit 16
 Turnovers: Cleveland 4 (2 int., 2 fum.); Detroit 9 (6 int., 3 fum.)
 Punts: Cleveland 4 (43.0 average); Detroit 6 (41.3 average)
 Penalties: Cleveland (4 for 40 yards); Detroit (5 for 63 yards)

Officials

Referee: Tom Timlin
Umpire: Sam Wilson
Head Linesman: Dan Tehan
Back Judge: James Hamer
Field Judge: William McHugh 
 

Financial summary 

 Paid attendance: 43,827
 Gross receipts (includes TV and radio): $289,126.43
 Net receipts: $263,606.07
 Total players' pool (70% of net): $184,524.25
 Winners' pool: $99,643.10 ($2,478.57 per player)
 Losers' pool: $66,428.73 ($1,585.63 per player)
 Pool for second place clubs (Eagles, Bears): $18,452.42
 Browns ownership share: $19,770.45
 Lions ownership share: $19,770.46
 League share: $39,540.91

Legacy

Detroit quarterback Layne (18 for 42, passing for 177 yards) was intercepted six times, with Len Ford and Kenny Konz pulling in two each. The Browns also recovered three Detroit fumbles, with two of the recoveries leading to scores.

The 56–10 score was the second most lopsided in the 22-year history of the event, exceeded only by the 1940 game, in which the Chicago Bears embarrassed the Washington Redskins 73–0. The 46 point margin of victory is the second highest in championship history since the NFL began the annual game in 1933. The largest margin of victory in the Super Bowl (which is the NFL Championship Game) was 45 points in Super Bowl XXIV.

The victory was the second World Professional Football Championship win for the Browns.

The gross receipts for the game, including over $101,000 for radio and television rights, were just over $289,000. Each player on the winning Browns team received $2,478, while Lions players made $1,585 each.

Footnotes

Further reading

 

Championship Game, 1954
1954 NFL Championship Game
Cleveland Browns postseason
Detroit Lions postseason
NFL Championship
December 1954 sports events in the United States
Sports competitions in Cleveland